Charles Albert Boynton (November 26, 1867 – October 12, 1954) was a United States district judge of the United States District Court for the Western District of Texas, serving for 30 years from 1924 to 1954.

Education and career

Born in Quebec, Canada, Boynton received a Bachelor of Business Studies degree from Glasgow Normal School (now Western Kentucky University) in 1888 and a Bachelor of Laws from the University of Michigan Law School in 1891. He was in private practice in Waco, Texas from 1891 to 1907. He was the United States Attorney for the Western District of Texas from 1907 to 1912, and then returned to private practice in Waco until 1924.

Federal judicial service

On December 16, 1924, Boynton was nominated by President Calvin Coolidge to a seat on the United States District Court for the Western District of Texas vacated by Judge William Robert Smith. Boynton was confirmed by the United States Senate on December 17, 1924, and received his commission the same day. He assumed senior status on May 1, 1947, serving in that capacity until his death on October 12, 1954, in Dallas, Texas.

References

Sources
 

1867 births
1954 deaths
United States Attorneys for the Western District of Texas
Judges of the United States District Court for the Western District of Texas
United States district court judges appointed by Calvin Coolidge
20th-century American judges
University of Michigan Law School alumni